Paul L. Gagné (born February 6, 1962) is a Canadian former professional ice hockey player who played 390 games in the National Hockey League.  He played for the Colorado Rockies, New Jersey Devils, Toronto Maple Leafs and New York Islanders.

He coached the Timmins Rock, a team in the NOJHL, until his retirement after the 2016-17 season. He runs a hockey development camp every summer in Timmins, Ontario called Gagné Hockey Development.

Early career 
Gagne began his career at the age of 15 in the NOJHL for the Iroquois Falls Abitibi Eskimos. The Left Wing player had 45 goals and 85 points in 43 games that year. In the next year he played in the OMJHL with the Windsor Spitfires (24 goals and 42 points in 67 games). It was his 101 points in 1979-1980 that led him to be drafted at the age of 17.

Career statistics

References

External links 

1962 births
Living people
Canadian ice hockey forwards
Colorado Rockies (NHL) draft picks
Colorado Rockies (NHL) players
EHC Biel players
EHC Olten players
EV Landshut players
Franco-Ontarian people 
Ice hockey people from Ontario
National Hockey League first-round draft picks
New Jersey Devils players
New York Islanders players
Newmarket Saints players
People from Iroquois Falls, Ontario
Springfield Indians players
Toronto Maple Leafs players
Wichita Wind players
Windsor Spitfires players
ZSC Lions players
Canadian expatriate ice hockey players in Germany